Gianluigi Aponte (born 27 June 1940) is an Italian billionaire businessman, and the founder, owner and chairman of Mediterranean Shipping Company (MSC).

Early life
Gianluigi Aponte was born in Sant'Agnello, Italy (near Sorrento, in the province of Naples) on 27 June 1940.

Career
Aponte is a Neapolitan captain, who entered the shipping industry in 1970 together with his spouse, Rafaela. At the time, the newly-formed company owned a single vessel that shipped cargo between Europe and Africa. With the growth of his business, he made a move into the cruise industry in 1988. As of 2014, he had retired from the position of CEO and president in favour of his son Diego Aponte, assuming the role of executive chairman within MSC.

Honours
In 2009, at the Teatro di San Carlo of Naples, he received, along with Fabio Cannavaro, Ambra Vallo and others, a prize for "Neapolitan Excellence in the World" from then-Italian prime minister  Silvio Berlusconi.

In 2012, he won the Cruise International Lifetime Achievement Award in recognition of his long term activity in the industry.

In October 2013, he received Containerisation International’s Lifetime Achievement Award, as well as a knighthood, the Order of Merit for Labour, from Italian President Giorgio Napolitano. The Aponte family have featured prominently in the Lloyd's List Top 100 most influential people in the shipping industry, named in the top 10 in 2014 and in position 16 in 2018.

Personal life
He is married to Rafaela Diamant Pinas, a Swiss woman of Israeli origin, and daughter of a Geneva banker, he met when she was a passenger on a boat of which he was the captain. They have two children, Diego Aponte and Alexa Aponte Vago, who serve respectively as CEO and CFO of MSC.

References

External links
 MSC

1940 births
Living people
People from Sorrento
Italian businesspeople in shipping
Italian billionaires
Italian expatriates in Switzerland
Recipients of the Order of Merit for Labour
Swiss billionaires